Brachinus pecoudi is a species of ground beetle from the Brachininae subfamily that is endemic to Spain. The species have 3 subspecies all of which are endemic to Spain.

References

Beetles described in 1925
Endemic fauna of Spain
Beetles of Europe
Brachininae